Hugo Hernán Spangenberg (born 22 November 1975) is an Argentine chess grandmaster.

In 1989 he entered the World Youth Chess Championships, in Puerto Rico. He won at Cubatão 1989 (the 1st Campeonato Panamericano U-14), and took 3rd at Halle 1995 (World Junior Chess Championship, U-20).

Spangenberg was Argentine Champion in 1993 and Sub-Champion in 1996. He shared 1st with Pablo Ricardi at Villa Gesell 1996, won at Buenos Aires 1998, and tied for 1st-3rd with Carlos Garcia Palermo and Herman Van Riemsdijk at La Plata 1998. 

He thrice represented Argentina in Chess Olympiads at Moscow 1994, Yerevan 1996, and Elista 1998.

He was awarded the Grandmaster title in 1996.

References

External links

Rating data for Hugo Spangenberg

1975 births
Living people
Argentine chess players
Jewish chess players
Jewish Argentine sportspeople
Chess grandmasters